The 1977 Tour du Haut Var was the ninth edition of the Tour du Haut Var cycle race and was held on 27 February 1977. The race started in Seillans and finished in Draguignan. The race was won by Bernard Thévenet.

General classification

References

1977
1977 in road cycling
1977 in French sport